Maru Dueñas (born María Eugenia Dueñas Posadas; October 3, 1967 – November 11, 2017) was a Mexican actress, director and producer.

Dueñas studied at the Andrés Soleracademy and later at the Centro de Educación Artística of Televisa in 1986.

Death
Dueñas died in a car accident on November 11, 2017, when the truck in which she was traveling, owned by the Televisa company, hit a truck at kilometer 46 of the Mexico-Cuernavaca highway. The director Claudio Reyes Rubio, son of the Mexican actress María Rubio, also died in the accident.

Filmography

Television 
 Cenizas y diamantes (1990) as Cuquín
 Ángeles blancos (1990/91)
 Más allá del puente (1993) as Carmelita
 La vida en risa (1994)
 La chuchufleta (1995)
 Todo de todo (1997)
 La Güereja y algo más (1998)
 Diversión desconocida (1998/99)
 Las delicias del poder (1999)
 La casa en la playa (2000) as Nina López
 Mujer, casos de la vida real (2002/16) 20 episodes
 El terreno de Eva (2003)
 Piel de otoño (2004)
 La fea más bella (2006) as Nurse
 Alma de hierro (2008/09) as Sonia
 La rosa de Guadalupe (2008/12) 36 episodes
 Los Simuladores (2009)
 Ellas son... la alegría del hogar (2009)
 Lo que la vida me robó (2014) as Zulema
 Tres veces Ana (2016) as Cecilia
 Como dice el dicho (2017) 3 episodes

Films 
 Hasta morir (1994) as Diana

Theatre 
 La jaula de las locas
 A Chorus Line
 Cats
 Las bodas de Fígaro
 Un tipo con suerte
 La isla del tesoro
 El príncipe feliz
 La leyenda del beso
 Nosotras que nos queremos tanto
 Gypsy (musical)
 Expreso astral
 Adorables enemigas
 Orgasmos
 Solo quiero hacerte feliz
 Placer o no ser
 Scherezada
 Nosotras que nos queremos tanto
 El show de Jerry Lewis sin Jerry Lewis
 La misma gata pero con botas

Short films 
 Letras capitales (1993)
 La crisálida (1996)

Direction 
 Papi piernas largas (2017)

Dialogue 
 Lo que la vida me robó (2013/14)
 Tres veces Ana (2016)
 1st part of Me declaro culpable (2017)

Production 
 En busca de una familia feliz (1986)
 Cinexxxitarse (1996)

References

External links 
 

1967 births
2017 deaths
Road incident deaths in Mexico
Mexican telenovela actresses
Mexican television actresses
Mexican film actresses
Mexican stage actresses
Mexican theatre directors
Mexican film producers
Actresses from Mexico City
20th-century Mexican actresses
21st-century Mexican actresses
People from Mexico City

Accidental deaths in Mexico